Freshers is a reality documentary series that airs on ITV2. The series follows a group of freshers in their early days at university, showing how they adapt to life away from home, exploring how they make friends and study. The first series was filmed in 2013 at the University of Bedfordshire and its success led ITV to renew it for a second series. The follow up series was filmed at Swansea University in Wales at the start of the 2014–15 academic year.

References

External links
Freshers on ITV Player
Mentorn Media website

2013 British television series debuts
2010s British reality television series
ITV reality television shows
British college television series
British documentary television series
Swansea University
University of Bedfordshire